Femke Merel van Kooten-Arissen (born 9 November 1983) is a Dutch politician and former member of the House of Representatives.

She was first elected in the 2017 general election, in which she stood as a member of the Party for the Animals (Partij voor de Dieren - PvdD). From 15 October 2018 to 4 February 2019, she was on maternity leave from Parliament.

On 16 July 2019, she left the PvdD and became an independent MP. In December 2019, she joined 50Plus but remained an independent member of parliament. She left 50Plus in May 2020 together with its leader Henk Krol, forming the Party for the Future (Partij voor de Toekomst - PvdT).

After about three months, in early August 2020, she left the PvdT in opposition to its merger with Group Otten (Groep Otten - GO), a party formed by former members of the far right Forum for Democracy (Forum voor Democratie - FVD). The merger had been arranged by Krol without her knowledge. Once again, she became an independent member of parliament, and remained so for the rest of the parliamentary term. The Party for the Future was eventually completely dissolved before the end of 2020.

For the general election in 2021, van Kooten formed her own party named Splinter, and was the party's lead candidate (lijsttrekker). However, Splinter received only 30,000 votes, less than half of the 70,000 vote threshold required for a seat. As a result, she did not return to the House of Representatives.

References

1983 births
Living people
Dutch political consultants
Dutch political party founders
Dutch women activists
Dutch women environmentalists
Dutch women jurists
Independent politicians in the Netherlands
Members of the House of Representatives (Netherlands)
Members of the Provincial Council of Utrecht
Party for the Animals politicians
People from Huizen
Utrecht University alumni
21st-century Dutch jurists
21st-century Dutch women politicians
21st-century Dutch politicians